Papilio antonio is a butterfly of the family Papilionidae. It is endemic to the Philippines.

The wingspan is 90–110 mm.

Subspecies 

There are two recognised subspecies:
 Papilio antonio antonio (Basilan, Leyte and Mindanao)
 Papilio antonio negrosiana Schröder & Treadaway (Southern Negros)

Taxonomy
Papilio antonio is a member of the noblei species-group; closely related to the demolion species group. The members of this clade are
 Papilio antonio Hewitson, [1875]
 Papilio noblei de Nicéville, [1889]

Further reading
 
 William C. Hewitson: Illustrations of new species of exotic butterflies, selected chiefly from the Collections of W. Wilson Saunders and William C. Hewitson. Bd.1, London, John Van Voorst, 1866 PDF (10 MB)
Page M. G.P & Treadaway,C. G.  2003 Schmetterlinge der Erde, Butterflies of the world Part XVII (17), Papilionidae IX Papilionidae of the Philippine Islands. Edited by Erich Bauer and Thomas Frankenbach Keltern: Goecke & Evers; Canterbury: Hillside Books. 

antonio
Butterflies of Indochina
Endemic fauna of the Philippines
Lepidoptera of the Philippines
Butterflies described in 1875